Pont-d'Ouilly is a commune in the Calvados department in the Normandy region in northwestern France.

Pont-d'Ouilly is home to the famous Haras d'Ouilly, a Thoroughbred horse racing and breeding business currently owned by the Aga Khan IV.

History
The commune of Pont-d'Ouilly was created on 23 August 1947 from the merger of the two former communes of Saint-Marc-d'Ouilly and Ouilly-le-Basset (old INSEE code 14690) .

Population

See also
Communes of the Calvados department
Maurice Le Scouëzec

References

External links

 Official website

Communes of Calvados (department)
Calvados communes articles needing translation from French Wikipedia